1867 in archaeology

Explorations
 Ruins of Great Zimbabwe rediscovered by Adam Renders.

Excavations
 Oluf Rygh excavates the Tune ship in Norway.
 Excavations at Bibracte begun by Gabriel Bulliot (continue to 1907).
 September - Augustus Henry Lane-Fox undertakes his first excavation, at Cissbury Ring hill fort in West Sussex.

Finds
 George Smith discovers an inscription recording a solar eclipse in the month of Sivan on British Museum Tablet K51, which he is able to link to 15 June 763 BC, the cornerstone of ancient Near Eastern chronology.
 The (full) Speyer wine bottle is found in the excavation of a mid-4th century Roman tomb near Speyer in Germany.
 The Stele of Vespasian is found in Armazi, Georgia.

Events
 National Archaeological Museum of Spain is established in Madrid by Royal Decree of Isabella II.

Births
 13 May - Thomas Gann, Anglo Irish explorer and archaeologist of the Maya civilization (d. 1938)
 27 August - Alfred Lucas, English analytical chemist and archaeologist, part of Howard Carter's team at the excavation of Tutankhamun's tomb (d. 1945)

Deaths
 August 3 - August Böckh, German classical scholar and antiquarian (b. 1785)

See also
 List of years in archaeology
 1866 in archaeology
 1868 in archaeology

References

Archaeology
Archaeology by year
Archaeology
Archaeology